Patrik Hasler (born 26 October 1947) is a Liechtensteiner cross-country skier. He competed in the men's 15 kilometre classical event at the 1988 Winter Olympics.

References

External links
 

1947 births
Living people
Liechtenstein male cross-country skiers
Olympic cross-country skiers of Liechtenstein
Cross-country skiers at the 1988 Winter Olympics
Place of birth missing (living people)